The men's long jump event at the 1987 Summer Universiade was held at the Stadion Maksimir in Zagreb on 14 and 16 July 1987.

Medalists

Results

Qualification

Qualification distance: 7.75 metres

Final

References

Athletics at the 1987 Summer Universiade
1987